Jotivini Tabua (born 25 January 1996) is a Fijian footballer who plays as a defender for Labasa FC and captains the Fiji women's national team.

In August 2018 she was named to the Fijian team for the 2018 OFC Women's Nations Cup.

Notes

References

1996 births
Living people
Women's association football defenders
Fijian women's footballers
Fiji women's international footballers